Nicollier may refer to:

 14826 Nicollier, a main-belt asteroid
 Claude Nicollier, Swiss astronaut
 Jean-Michel Nicollier, French-Croatian soldier
 Henri Nicollier, French aircraft manufacturer

French-language surnames